Eastern Outer Islands may refer to:

Santa Cruz Islands, an island group in the Solomon Islands
Eastern Outer Islands constituency, a former constituency in the Solomon Islands